Buddakan is a restaurant chain serving Pan-Asian fusion cuisine owned by STARR Restaurants with locations in Philadelphia, Pennsylvania, and New York City, New York.

Stephen Starr opened the first restaurant in 1998 in Philadelphia.

Buddakan Atlantic City closed in October 2020 after the COVID-19 pandemic.

References

External links
 
 Buddakan NYC website

Restaurants in New York City
Restaurants in Philadelphia
Restaurants in Atlantic City, New Jersey
1998 establishments in Pennsylvania
Restaurants established in 1998
Asian restaurants in the United States